The DS 37 Match Racer is a  long sloop rigged sailboat, designed by Jacob Vierø in 1991 and used in the Stena Match Cup Sweden, part of the World Match Racing Tour. The design of the boat emphasizes that it is used for match racing, with an oversized rudder, and simple controls. The boat is popular as a teaching boat for beginners as well because of its simplicity and robustness. However, in Match racing, it is one of the most physically demanding boats found in the international matchracing circuit. The boat is used mainly in the Scandinavian countries, where it can be found as inventory of several of the big yacht clubs, such as the Royal Danish Yacht Club or the Royal Gothenburg Yacht Club.

References 

 https://web.archive.org/web/20121109024346/http://www.wmrt.com/tour-info/boats.html?boat=12
 https://web.archive.org/web/20120914204156/http://www.lysekilwomensmatch.se/tavlingen/battyp-ds37-match-racer

Vehicles introduced in 1991
1990s sailboat type designs
Sailboat type designs by Danish designers
Keelboats